Perry Elvin Miller (born June 24, 1952 in Winnipeg, Manitoba) is a Canadian retired professional ice hockey player who played 201 games in the World Hockey Association and 217 games in the National Hockey League between 1974 and 1981. He played for the Minnesota Fighting Saints, Detroit Red Wings, and Winnipeg Jets.

Awards and achievements
SHL Second All-Star Team (1974)
Honoured Member of the Manitoba Hockey Hall of Fame
 On 1 February 1977, Miller scored four times in an 11-1 rout over the Edmonton Oilers and set a WHA record for most goals by a defenceman in one game.

Career statistics

Regular season and playoffs

External links
 

1952 births
Living people
Adirondack Red Wings players
Canadian ice hockey defencemen
Charlotte Checkers (EHL) players
Charlotte Checkers (SHL) players
Detroit Red Wings players
Kildonan North Stars players
Minnesota Fighting Saints players
Ice hockey people from Winnipeg
Undrafted National Hockey League players
Winnipeg Jets (WHA) players